Southwest High School, Southwestern High School, or South Western High School may refer to:

Southwest
Southwest High School (El Centro, California)
Southwest Senior High School, San Diego, California
Southwest Miami Senior High School, Miami, Florida
Southwest High School (Macon, Georgia)
Southwest Magnet High School, Macon, Georgia
Southwest High School (Minneapolis)
Southwest Early College Campus, Kansas City, Missouri
Southwest High School (Kansas City, Missouri)
Little Rock Southwest High School, Little Rock, Arkansas
Southwest R-1 School District, Ludlow, Missouri
Southwest High School (Washburn, Missouri), Washburn, Missouri
Lincoln Southwest High School, Lincoln, Nebraska
Southwest Guilford High School (North Carolina), High Point, North Carolina
Southwest High School (Jacksonville, North Carolina)
Southwest High School (Fort Worth, Texas)
Southwest High School (San Antonio, Texas)
Green Bay Southwest High School, Green Bay, Wisconsin

Southwestern / South Western
Southwestern High School (Piasa, Illinois)
Southwestern High School (Hanover, Indiana)
Southwestern Junior-Senior High School, Shelbyville, Indiana
Southwestern High School (Kentucky), Somerset, Kentucky
Southwestern Senior High School (Baltimore, Maryland)
Southwestern High School (Michigan), Detroit, Michigan
Southwestern High School (New York), West Ellicott, Jamestown, New York
South Western High School (Hanover, Pennsylvania), Hanover, Pennsylvania